Burmester Dome is an ice-capped dome rising to  in west-central Saratoga Table, Forrestal Range, in the Pensacola Mountains. At the suggestion of United States Geological Survey party leader Arthur B. Ford, it was named by the Advisory Committee on Antarctic Names after Russell F. Burmester, geologist, Western Washington University, Bellingham, who worked in the Forrestal Range, 1978–79.

References
 

Ice caps of Antarctica
Bodies of ice of Queen Elizabeth Land